Frederick Allen Nutter (May 1, 1929 – October 15, 2005), known professionally as Rik Van Nutter, was an American actor who appeared in many minor films and the James Bond picture Thunderball.

Career
He is best known for playing the third version of Felix Leiter in the James Bond film Thunderball (1965). He also had a role alongside Peter Ustinov in Romanoff and Juliet (1961), and his later films included Foxbat (1977) with Henry Silva and Vonetta McGee and the Jim Brown WW2 adventure Pacific Inferno (1979).

Personal life
Van Nutter was married to film actress Anita Ekberg from 1963 until 1975. They lived in Spain and Switzerland and started a shipping business together.

Death
Van Nutter died on October 15, 2005, at the age of 76.

Filmography

References

External links

1929 births
2005 deaths
American people of Dutch descent
American male film actors
Male actors from California
20th-century American male actors